Viktoriia Andreevna Safonova (born 8 May 2003) is a Russian-Belarusian figure skater. She is the 2019 CS Golden Spin of Zagreb silver medalist, the 2021 CS Nebelhorn Trophy bronze medalist, the 2020 Ice Star champion, the 2019 Volvo Open Cup champion, and a two-time Belarusian national champion (2020, 2021).

Competing on the junior level for Russia, she is the 2018 Ice Star champion.

Personal life 
Viktoriia Safonova was born on 8 May 2003 in Moscow.

Career

Early career 
Safonova placed fourteenth at the 2018 Russian Junior Championships and eighth at the 2019 Russian Junior Championships. Competing for Russia, she was the 2018 Ice Star junior champion.

2019–2020 season 
Safonova switched to representing Belarus in August 2019, alongside former Russian national teammates Konstantin Milyukov and Victoria Yatsenko / Daniel Parkman. She placed fourth at a Russian domestic event earlier in the summer, but was not included into the national team. Safonova won the Summer Cup of the Skating Union of Belarus in her domestic debut.

According to International Skating Union rules for switching nationalities, Safonova was required to sit out international competition for a year dating from her last international appearance, ruling her ineligible for Junior Grand Prix events. Safonova made her international debut for Belarus at the 2019 Volvo Open Cup, where she won the gold medal ahead of Azerbaijan's Ekaterina Ryabova and Alina Urushadze of Georgia. She then placed seventh at 2019 CS Warsaw Cup. Safonova earned personal bests in all segments to win the silver medal at 2019 CS Golden Spin of Zagreb, behind Elizaveta Tuktamysheva of Russia and ahead of Germany's Nicole Schott.

Safonova won the national title in her first attempt at the 2020 Belarusian Championships, ahead of Milana Ramashova and Anastasiya Sidorenko. She then finished fourteenth at the 2020 European Championships.  Safonova had been assigned to compete at the World Championships in Montreal, but those were cancelled as a result of the coronavirus pandemic.

2020–2021 season 
Safonova opened her season at the 2020 Ice Star in October, winning gold ahead of Russians Anastasiia Guliakova and Sofia Samodurova.  She was assigned to make her Grand Prix debut at the 2020 Rostelecom Cup, placing eighth at the event. Safonova was scheduled to compete at the 2021 World Championships but was forced to withdraw two days before the ladies' short program due to a positive COVID-19 test.

2021–2022 season 
Following the withdrawal from the World Championships, Safonova competed at the beginning of the new season at the 2021 CS Nebelhorn Trophy, seeking a second opportunity to qualify a berth for Belarus at the 2022 Winter Olympics. She was third in both segments to win the bronze medal, taking the third of six available spots. She went on to place eighth at the 2021 CS Finlandia Trophy and repeat as gold medalist at the Ice Star. She won the gold medal at the 2021 CS Denis Ten Memorial Challenge. Safonova was invited to compete on the Grand Prix at the 2021 Rostelecom Cup following the withdrawal of Kazakh skater Elizabet Tursynbaeva. She placed seventh at the event. 

At the 2022 European Championships in Tallinn, Safonova finished ninth. Named to the Belarusian team for the 2022 Winter Olympics, Safonova placed seventeenth in the short program of the women's event. Thirteenth in the free skate, she rose to thirteenth overall.

Programs

Competitive highlights 
GP: Grand Prix; CS:  Challenger Series

For Belarus

For Russia

Detailed results 
Small medals for short and free programs awarded only at ISU Championships.

For Belarus

For Russia

References

External links 
 

2003 births
Living people
Russian female single skaters
Belarusian female single skaters
Russian emigrants to Belarus
Figure skaters from Moscow
Figure skaters at the 2022 Winter Olympics
Olympic figure skaters of Belarus